Milagiriya is a district of Colombo city in Sri Lanka. The area took its name from the Sinhalised form of the Portuguese word milagre (miracle). The Portuguese built a Roman Catholic Church there.

History 

The writer Frederick Mendis observed: "In 1656, after the capitulation to the Dutch, the Milagiriya church gave way to a Sinhalese school where instruction was made available in the religion of the Reformists. The headmaster of the school was the registrar of baptisms, marriages, and deaths. In 1848 the Rev. Joseph Thurstan was chiefly responsible for superintending the construction of the new church which was dedicated to St. Paul the Apostle."

The British built a new church on these grounds in 1848 and named it St. Paul's Church, the church is now an important landmark in Colombo.

A parish school was founded on 14 January 1887. St. Paul's Milagiriya School is now run by the Government of Sri Lanka.

See also 
St. Paul's Church, Milagiriya
Colombo
Church of Ceylon
St. Paul’s Girls School, Milagiriya

References

External links 
 Canon Ivan Corea of St. Paul's Church Milagiriya

Populated places in Colombo District